Ithocritus is a genus of longhorn beetles of the subfamily Lamiinae, containing the following species:

 Ithocritus multimaculatus Pic, 1934
 Ithocritus ruber (Hope, 1839)

References

Petrognathini